The Michael Kelly Guitar Company is a US musical instrument company founded in 1999 and based in Clearwater, Florida. Michael Kelly imports high quality instruments manufactured to their specifications (mainly from South Korea). The company has recently gained popularity, particularly due to the release of their new Mod Shop Guitars, where they take some of their standard designs and swap out the pickups using Lindy Fralin, Seymour Duncan, TV Jones, Bare Knuckle and Fishman.

Michael Kelly gained popularity due to their Dragonfly II acoustic bass, which has been used by Duff McKagan of Guns N' Roses, Shavo Odadjian of System of a Down, and Tony Bigley of Souls Harbor.

Current line of products commercialised by Michael Kelly includes electric and acoustic guitars, basses, acoustic and electric mandolins.

Current models

Electric guitars 

Patriot Black
Patriot Custom
Patriot Decree
Patriot Limited
Patriot Premium
Patriot Standard
Patriot Supreme
Hybrid
Hybrid Special
1950s Model Guitars
1960s Model Guitars

Acoustic guitars 

 Forte Port
 Forte Exotic JE
 Koa Special
 Triad 10E
 Triad Port
 Forte Port X
 3D Grand Auditorium

Acoustic basses 

Dragonfly 4 String
Dragonfly 4 String Left Handed
Dragonfly 5 String
Dragonfly 4 String Fretless
Dragonfly 5 String Fretless

Electric basses 

Element 4Q
Element 5Q
Custom Collection Element 4
Custom Collection Element 5
Rick Turner B4 Bass

Mandolins 
A-Style Mandolins
F-Style Mandolins
Electric F-Style Mandolins

Discontinued electric models 

Hex Deluxe
Valor X #Double-cut#
Valor Q #Double-cut#
Valor Limited #Double-cut#
Valor Custom #Double-cut#
Hourglass (PRS Santana/Les Paul, Double-cut)
Vibe #Hollowbody#
Deuce Phoenix  #Hollowbody#
Patriot Phoenix #Single-cut)
vex nv #double cut#

References

External links
 Official website

Guitar manufacturing companies of the United States
Musical instrument manufacturing companies of the United States
Companies based in Clearwater, Florida